The Risc PC is Acorn Computers's RISC OS/Acorn RISC Machine computer, launched on 15 April 1994, which superseded the Acorn Archimedes. The Acorn PC card and software allows PC compatible software to be run.

Like the Archimedes, the Risc PC continues the practice of having the RISC OS operating system in a ROM module. Risc PC augments the ROM-based core OS with a disk-based directory structure containing configuration information, and some applications which had previously been kept in ROM. At the 1996 BETT Educational Computing & Technology Awards, the machine was awarded Gold in the hardware category.

Technical specifications

Use 

The Risc PC was used by music composers and scorewriters to run the Sibelius scorewriting software.

Between 1994 and 2008, the Risc PC and A7000+ were used in television for broadcast automation, programmed by the UK company OmniBus Systems: once considered "the world leader in television station automation" and at one point automating "every national news programme on terrestrial television in the United Kingdom". The Risc PC, in the form of the OmniBus Workstation, and a customised version of the A7000+ built into a 19-inch rack mount unit, known as the OmniBus Interface Unit, were used to control/automate multiple television broadcast devices from other manufacturers in a way that was unusual at the time. In 2002, OmniBus products were "in constant use worldwide at nearly 100 broadcasters" including the BBC and ITN.

Timeline 
 1994 – Risc PC 600 launched, featuring a 30 MHz ARM610 CPU.
 1995 – 40 MHz ARM710 CPU upgrade and Risc PC 700 model launched.
 1996 – 200 MHz StrongARM CPU upgrade released, offering a five-fold increase in raw processing power compared to the ARM7 used in the previous high-end machines.
 1997 – Acorn launch Acorn J233 StrongARM Risc PC, featuring an uprated 233 MHz model of StrongARM and including Browser and Java software.
 1998 – Castle Technology acquire the rights to continue to market and produce the Risc PC during the breakup of Acorn Computers.
 2000 – In May, Castle Technology reveal the Kinetic Risc PC range which included a faster processor card with onboard memory.
 2001 – Viewfinder Podule, AGP adapter allows the use of IBM PC clone AGP graphics cards (e.g. a range of ATI Rage and Radeon).
 2003 – Castle Technology announce the end of production and sale of the Risc PC.

Risc PC 2 

Acorn set about designing the Risc PC 2, later renamed to Phoebe 2100 a design with a 64 MHz front-side bus, PCI slots, and a yellow NLX form-factor case. Slated for release in late 1998, the project was abandoned just before completion, when Acorn's Workstation Division was closed. Only two prototypes were ever built, and one was publicly displayed for historical interest at the RISC OS 2001 show in Berkshire, England. The remaining cases were bought by CTA Direct who sold them off to the public.

After Acorn 
In 2003 it was confirmed that no more Risc PCs would be produced. However RISC OS computers based on other ARM processors machines have been manufactured by companies since this date.

 Castle Technology – Iyonix PC based on the Intel XScale ARM processor and PCI bus
 Advantage Six – A9home based on the Samsung S3C2440 ARM processor
 RiscStation – R7500 based on the ARM7500-FE processor

Significantly better performance has been reached on the aged Risc PC design by using the newer 203 (and later 236) MHz StrongARM CPU, using third-party video cards, overclocking, and having specially-designed CPU cards with RAM located upon them to sidestep the speed bottleneck of the slow system bus.

Limitations 
The 16 MHz front-side bus is usually recognised as being the most significant fault of the computer; and the arrival of the (five times faster) StrongARM processor in 1996 meant that the Risc PC had a CPU significantly faster than the computer had been designed for. Acorn had originally expected ARM CPUs to progress from the 30 MHz ARM6 to the 40 MHz ARM7, and then onto the ARM8 cores, which at the time were clocked at around 50–80 MHz. In 2000, Castle released "Kinetic", a new StrongARM processor board with its own onboard memory slots augmenting main memory, reducing the need to negotiate the slow front-side bus for memory accesses.

The podule bus on the Risc PC can achieve a maximum data throughput of approximately 6100 KByte/s. It is 32-bit and Risc PC predecessors have a 16-bit bus. For comparison, the PCI bus, which was available in systems at the time of the Risc PC's introduction, is over 20 times faster. The transfer of 650 MB would take 2 minutes via podule, compared to 5 seconds via PCI.

See also 
 Acorn A7000

References

External links 
 Acorn's 10-slice Rocket Ship Risc PC, including pizza oven and kitchen sink
 Castle reveal Kinetic Risc PC to the press
 Risc PC 10th Birthday
 Risc PC production ceases

Acorn Computers
RISC OS
ARM-based home computers
Personal computers
Computers designed in the United Kingdom